Mihail Mihaylov (born 4 March 1973) is a Bulgarian former football midfielder who played several seasons for PFC Velbazhd Kyustendil.  He also had a brief stint in Germany for SSV Ulm 1846.

Mihaylov was the leading scorer in the league during the Bulgarian A Liga's 1999-2000 season, scoring 20 goals for Velbazhd.

External links
 Profile at BulgarianPlayers.com
 1999-2000 Statistics at PFL.bg
 Profile at Kicker.de

1973 births
Living people
Bulgarian footballers
Association football forwards
PFC Levski Sofia players
PFC Slavia Sofia players
PFC Velbazhd Kyustendil players
PFC Lokomotiv Plovdiv players
SSV Ulm 1846 players
First Professional Football League (Bulgaria) players
Bulgarian expatriate footballers
Expatriate footballers in Germany